Roger Stafford may refer to:

 Roger Stafford (musician), member of the Royale Monarchs
 Roger Dale Stafford (1951–1995), convicted spree killer and serial killer
 Roger Stafford, 6th Baron Stafford (1572–1640)